The Northumbrian burr is the distinctive uvular pronunciation of R in the traditional dialects of Northumberland, Tyneside ('Geordie'), and northern County Durham, now remaining only among speakers of rural Northumberland, excluding Tyne and Wear. It is one of the few rhotic dialects left in England.

Pronunciation
According to Påhlsson (1972), the Burr is typically pronounced as a voiced uvular fricative, often with accompanying lip-rounding. Approximant, voiceless fricative, tapped and trilled uvular pronunciations occur occasionally. The data for Northumberland and northern Durham in the Survey of English Dialects (gathered in the 1950s) suggest that in addition to full pronunciation in syllable onset, uvular  in these dialects was usually maintained in syllable coda position, typically as uvularisation of the preceding vowel.

Effects on neighbouring sounds
The Northumbrian Burr has affected the pronunciation of adjacent vowels, particularly those that precede it, which were subject to 'Burr Modification':
 Påhlsson (1972: 20) notes that "Burr-modified vowels are vowels that have become retracted and lowered (in most cases) due to a following posterior , e.g. 'first' , 'word' ".
 Wells (1982: 396–97) states that "It is the effect of uvular  on a preceding vowel which has historically given rise to forms such as  birds,  worms in Northumberland: the  has not only coalesced with the vowel, making it uvularized, but has also caused it to be retracted from centre to back".
 One effect of Burr Modification was the development of the Nurse-north Merger in dialects of English in northeast England.
In addition, Harold Orton reported that the Burr caused retraction of following alveolar consonants to post-alveolar or retroflex position.

History
Since uvular R is not typical of other English dialects, it may be assumed that this pronunciation is an innovation in the northeast of England. When it occurred and whether the development is connected with the spread of guttural R throughout much of Western Europe are both unknown.

Heslop (1892) refers to the suggestion by James Murray that the Burr originated in the speech of Harry Hotspur, which Shakespeare describes as peculiar in some way:

However, Shakespeare's text does not indicate what was distinctive about Hotspur's speech so that may not be connected with the Northumbrian Burr.

The first definite reference to distinctive pronunciation of R in Northeastern England was made by Hugh Jones in 1724,
slightly predating the more well known description of it by Daniel Defoe, who wrote, in his A tour thro' the Whole Island of Great Britain, that:

Around the turn of the 20th century, the Burr was recorded by Alexander J. Ellis and by Joseph Wright. He divided his sites in Northumberland and north Durham into "Burr Strong", "Burr Weak" and "No Burr".

In the 20th century, it was recorded throughout much of the Northeast in the Orton Corpus.

Audio recordings 
Audio recordings were made in the 1950s for the Survey of English Dialects which feature the Northumbrian Burr, all of which are publicly available online:
 Wark
 Thropton
 Lowick
 Earsdon
 Embleton

Current status
The Northumbrian Burr, like many traditional dialect features in England, has largely disappeared from the dialects of northeast England, and it is no longer found in Tyneside English. Nevertheless, some older speakers, especially in northern Northumberland, still use it regularly.

See also
 Pitmatic

References

External links
 BBC - Radio 4 - Routes of English
 Recording of the Week: ever heard the 'Northumbrian burr'?
 British Library Sound Recordings for Northumberland
 Sound Comparisons (Holy Island) 

Culture in Northumberland
Dialects of English
Rhotic consonants